The Children of the Grail (German Die Kinder des Gral) is a historical novel published in 1996 and a series based on it written by Peter Berling.

The Children of the Grail (1996) (Die Kinder des Gral, 1991)
Blood of Kings (Das Blut der Könige, 1993)
The Crown of the World (Die Krone der Welt, 1995)
The Black Chalice (Der Schwarze Kelch, 1997)
The Kelim of the Princess (Der Kelim der Prinzessin, 2004)

1996 German novels
German historical novels
Novel series